J. Goldsteen Dupree (18461873) was an assassinated Republican black member of the Texas House of Representatives. He testified against two fellow black legislators who were then unseated for having received ineligible votes. Dupree was murdered, allegedly by white vigilantes.

See also
African-American officeholders during and following the Reconstruction era

References

1846 births
1873 deaths
19th-century African-American politicians
19th-century American politicians
Republican Party members of the Texas House of Representatives
Murdered African-American people
Assassinated American politicians
Male murder victims
People murdered in Texas

Assassinated American State House representatives